The Municipal Chamber of Araraquara is the legislative body of the government of Araraquara in the state of São Paulo in Brazil.

It is unicameral and is composed of 18 councilors.

History
In 1947, the country's first direct elections took place and the citizens of Araraquara elected the first Municipal Chamber through free and universal suffrage. Therefore, the legislature initiated in 1948 is considered the first in the history of Araraquara. Currently, the city is in its 18th legislature, post-Estado Novo.

Budget
Annual budget of the Chamber according to the LOA:

Councilors of the 17th legislature
In the 2016 election carried out on October 2, 355 people ran for 18 seats in the Araraquara City Council. 

Of the 18 elected, five were re-elected: Raimundo Bezerra (PRB), Juliana Damus (PP), Edio Lopes (PT), Elias Chediek (MDB) and Jéferson Yashuda (PSDB). 

Besides these, four more councilors who acted as alternates were elected: Gerson da Farmácia (MDB), Toninho do Mel (PT), Porsani (PSDB) and Lieutenant Santana (MDB).

List of presidents
 José Clozel 1948/1949
 Jose do Amaral Velosa 1950/1952/1954
 Jorge Borges Correa 1951
 Mario Ananias 1953/1958
 Otto Ernani Muller 1955
 Pedro Marão 1956/1957/1959
 José Galli 1960/1963
 Hermínio Pagotto 1961
 José Mussi 1962
 João Vergara Gonzalez 1964
 Álvaro Waldemar Colino 1965/1968
 Flávio Ferraz de Carvalho 1966/2000
 Wilmo Gonçalves 1967
 Miguel Tedde Neto 1969
 Jose Alberto Gonçalves “Gaeta” 1970/1971/1999
 Rubens Bellardi Ferreira 1972/1975/1976
 Arnaldo Izique Caramurú 1973-1974
 Gildo Merlos 1977/1978/1987/1988/1989/1990/1995/1996
 Manoel Marques de Jesus 1979-1980
 Geraldo Polezze 1981-1982
 José Roberto Cardozo 1983-1984
 Tadeu José Alves 1985-1986
 Omar de Souza e Silva 1991-1992 e 1993-1994
 Valderico Joe 1997-1998 e 2001-2002
 Eduardo Lauand 2003-2004
 Ronaldo Napeloso 2005-2006 e 2009-2010
 Carlos Alberto Manço 2007
 Edna Martins 2007-2008
 Aluisio Braz 2011-2012 e 2021-2022
 João Farias 2013-2014
 Elias Chediek 2015-2016
 Jéferson Yashuda 2017-2018
 Tenente Santana 2019-2020

References

Unicameral legislatures
Municipal chambers in Brazil